This is a list of candidates of the 1962 New South Wales state election. The election was held on 3 March 1962.

Retiring Members

Labor
 Keith Anderson (Paddington-Waverley) — lost preselection for Bligh.
 William Gollan (Randwick)
 Bill Lamb (Granville) — lost preselection.
 Spence Powell (Bankstown)
 Arthur Tonge (Canterbury) — lost preselection.

Liberal
 Ivan Black (Neutral Bay)

Country
 Sir Michael Bruxner (Tenterfield)
 Ray Fitzgerald (Gloucester)

Legislative Assembly
Sitting members are shown in bold text. Successful candidates are highlighted in the relevant colour.

See also
 Members of the New South Wales Legislative Assembly, 1962–1965

References

1962